Iolaus lalos, the lalos sapphire or pale sapphire, is a butterfly in the family Lycaenidae. The species was first described by Hamilton Herbert Druce in 1896. It is found in Uganda, Kenya, Tanzania, Malawi, Zimbabwe and Mozambique. The habitat consists of forests (including coastal forests) and coastal dune bush.

Adults are on wing from December to March.

The larvae feed on Phragmanthera usuiensis usuiensis and Erianthemum dregei.

Subspecies
Iolaus lalos lalos (coast of Kenya, Malawi, Zimbabwe: Chirinda Forest, Mozambique: Beira, Tanzania: coast inland to Usambara, Uluguru and Kilimanjaro mountains and Pemba Island)
Iolaus lalos kigezi (Stempffer & Bennett, 1958) (Uganda: west to the Kigezi and Ankole districts)

References

External links

Die Gross-Schmetterlinge der Erde 13: Die Afrikanischen Tagfalter. Plate XIII 67 f, g

Butterflies described in 1896
Iolaus (butterfly)
Butterflies of Africa
Taxa named by Hamilton Herbert Druce